David G Smith is an American singer, songwriter, guitarist and keyboardist. He splits his time between his native state of Iowa and Nashville, TN in addition to touring. Smith donates his time and raises money for various causes including St. Jude Children's Hospital, Boys Town, Rett Syndrome, Parkinson's Disease, and Alzheimer's Disease.

Career
As an artist in the 70's, Smith released a single he called his wrote

"Positive Side" as a member of the Robin Banks Band under the stage name, David Gibran. This Colorado based band was managed for a time by Ed "Cass" Cassidy drummer for the American band, Spirit. Smith moved from Colorado to Nashville in the 80's to focus on his work as a songwriter.

Smith's songs have been cut by a string of indie artists to include Rissi Palmer (Mr. Ooh La La) and The Chad Williams Band (Ripples on the Moon). His songs have also been placed in TV shows including TNT: “Saving Grace” (Mr. Ooh La La/March 16, 2009 “Take Me Some Place Earl”) and Lifetime Network: “Chasing Nashville” (Walk Away Clean – Helena Hunt). Mr. Ooh La La also appeared on Rissi Palmer's self-titled album, in Rissi Palmer's Country on The Travel Channel, and inspired a string of line dances around the world to include America, Canada and France.

One of his songs is listed on the 9/11 Memorial Museum Artist Registry (Angels Flew). Another won First place in the Country Category in the 2008 International Song Contest (Made For You). His co-written song with artist Anne E DeChant called "Sunday Morning Drive" found a No. 1 spot on Roots Music Alt Folk Chart in 2015.

Smith has 7 indie-released albums that have received national and international critical acclaim to include The Tennessean, No Depression, Elmore, and Fervor Coulee. He received the Robert K Oermann’s DisCovery Award, (Music Row/Nashville) for his Non-Fiction release in 2011. One House appeared on No Depression/Lee Zimmerman's list of "10 Terrific Albums To Listen To Right Now." His album, "First Love" rose to No. 1 on Roots Music Album Chart/Iowa in 2016.

He's appeared on TV to include NBC Affiliate's KWQC's Paula Sands Live, ABC affiliate WQAD's "Good Morning Quad Cities," and public television WQPT's "The Cities". His songs have received national radio play and he continues to perform in clubs and concert halls across America. He has hosted shows at the Bluebird Café in Nashville, TN since the mid 2000s and performed in several of Music City's Tin Pan South events over the years. His song "Doesn't Take Much Light" written with Dean Madonia went viral in the Boy Scout community and BSA invited Smith to perform it at an arena event for the Boy Scouts of America's National Order of the Arrow Centennial Celebration.(NOAC) Smith has shared the stage with many artists from a variety of genres to include Rissi Palmer, Chuck Pyle, Justin Townes Earle, Griffin House, Rory Block, Dave Moore, Kelly Willis, and Anne E DeChant. Artists Keb' Mo and Mary Gauthier have also appeared on his albums.

Discography
 Non-Fiction (2011)
 The Family Smith: Live From Nashville (2012)
 One House (2013)
 Live From The Ellen Kennedy Fine Arts Center w/ Justin Townes Earle (Virtual Release: 2014)
 The Family Smith: Live @ The Redstone (2015)
 First Love (2016)
 Who Cares (2019)

References

External links
 davidgsmithmusic.com

Year of birth missing (living people)
Living people
American folk guitarists
American rock guitarists
American country guitarists
American male guitarists
Musicians from Iowa
21st-century American keyboardists
21st-century American male singers
21st-century American singers
American male singer-songwriters